Random White Dude Be Everywhere is a compilation album by Diplo. It was released on Mad Decent on July 29, 2014. It debuted at number 2 on Billboards Dance/Electronic Albums chart.

Production
The album includes collaborations with Faustix, Imanos, Kai, Kstylis, Alvaro, Waka Flocka Flame, Yellow Claw, LNY TNZ, Steve Bays, Steve Aoki, Deorro, GTA, Angger Dimas, Travis Porter, and Nicky Da B. It also includes remixes by Danny Diggz, Thugli, Rickyxsan, Tony Romera, and Party Favor.

The album's title comes from a YouTube comment posted on one of Diplo's videos.

Critical reception

David Jeffries of AllMusic gave the album 3.5 out of 5 stars, calling it "a worthy round-up time capsule that works best when consumed in two EP-sized bites or parted out for mixtapes." Writing for Vice, Robert Christgau summarised it as "seven proven bangers gussied up with five remixes – in short, the obvious shit his base long ago had enough of d/b/a music for normal people seeking a pick-me-up. I suppose we could do without the remixes, but hell, excess is why he's richer than he is famous, and they're certainly not painful." Meanwhile, Colin Fitzgerlad of PopMatters gave the album 2 out of 10 stars, saying, "unlike much of Diplo's work, none of the songs on Random White Dude Be Everywhere are unique or extraordinary in any perceivable way."

Track listing

Charts

References

External links
 

2014 compilation albums
Diplo albums
Mad Decent albums
Albums produced by Diplo